Gennaro, DiGennaro, Di Gennaro, DeGennaro or De Gennaro is an Italian surname originating from the given name Gennaro. It may refer to the following notable people: 
 Antonio Di Gennaro, Italian football player
 Davide Di Gennaro (born 1988), Italian football midfielder
Flo Gennaro (born 1991), Argentine fashion model
Francesco Di Gennaro (born 1982), Italian football forward
Gaetano De Gennaro (1890–1959), Italian-Brazilian sculptor
Giovanni De Gennaro (disambiguation), multiple people
Gianluca Di Gennaro (born 1987), Italian football goalkeeper
Grace DeGennaro (born 1956), American artist
James F. Gennaro, American politician
Jane Gennaro (born 1953), American artist, illustrator, playwright, writer and voice actress
Lucrezia Gennaro (born 2001), Italian figure skater
Matt DeGennaro, American football player
Matteo di Génnaro (1621–1674), Roman Catholic prelate
Matteo Di Gennaro (born 1994), Italian football defender
 Monica De Gennaro (born 1987), Italian volleyball player
Patricia DeGennaro, American political scientist
Peter Gennaro (1919–2000), American dancer and choreographer 
Raffaele Di Gennaro (born 1993), Italian football goalkeeper
Sandy Gennaro (born 1951), American rock drummer

See also
Genaro (surname)

Italian-language surnames